Evan Harris Humphrey (March 5, 1875 – August 30, 1963) was a brigadier general in the United States Army.

Biography
Humphrey was born in Black Point, San Francisco, California on March 5, 1875. His father was major general and Medal of Honor recipient Charles Frederic Humphrey, Sr., his brothers were Brigadier General Charles F. Humphrey and Marine Corps Colonel Marion Bell Humphrey. Humphrey would marry Clara Swift, daughter of Major General Eben Swift and sister of Major General Innis P. Swift.

He died in San Antonio, Texas on August 30, 1963. Humphrey, along with Clara (1891–1942), are buried at Arlington National Cemetery.

Career
Humphrey would graduate from the United States Military Academy in 1899 as a cavalry officer and stationed in Cuba. From 1925 to 1929 he was an instructor at the United States Army War College at Washington Barracks, now Fort Lesley J. McNair before being placed named to command Fort Oglethorpe, Georgia and the 6th Cavalry Regiment until 1931. At Fort Bliss, he was executive officer and chief of staff for the 1st Cavalry Division. In 1933 he returned to the Army War College as assistant commandant of the college and promoted to brigadier general in February 1935. In June, became commanding general of the 1st Cavalry brigade and post commander at Fort Clark, Texas.

In 1936 he was assigned to the Philippines as commanding general of the 23rd Brigade at Fort William McKinley, then commanding general at Fort Stotsenburg to April 1938. His final posting in 1938 was commanding general of the New York Port of Embarkation at the Brooklyn Army Terminal in Brooklyn, New York until his mandatory retirement on March 31, 1939. Humphrey also pulled a temporary stint as commanding general, Second Corps Area at Fort Jay, Governors Island, New York from July 30 to November 5, 1938, between the assignments of Major General Frank Ross McCoy and Major General Hugh Aloysius Drum.

References

External links
Evan Harris Humphrey at ArlingtonCemetery.net, an unofficial website

People from California
United States Army generals
United States Military Academy alumni
Burials at Arlington National Cemetery
1963 deaths
1875 births
Military personnel from California
United States Army War College faculty
United States Army personnel of World War I
United States Army Cavalry Branch personnel